The Miracle Foundation is an international nonprofit organization supporting orphaned children in India and the United States. The organization has a stated goal of supporting orphaned children, bringing change to reduce the need for orphanages, and ensuring that the rights of orphaned children are followed, as laid out in the United Nations Convention on the Rights of the Child.

History 
Miracle Foundation was founded in May 2000 by Caroline Boudreaux. 

The foundation primarily cites the Convention on the Rights of the Child as an inspiration and guideline for their work.

Programs 

The organization's stated mission is to "empower orphans to reach their full potential." The organization mentors and monitors orphanages to improve quality of care.

Awards 

Miracle Foundation Founder Caroline Boudreaux was honored as one of UBS' Global Visionaries in February 2017 for her work with the organization. The organization was awarded the Humanitarian Award by the Austin Chapter of the United Nations Association in October 2017.

References 

Non-profit organizations based in the United States